Myles Stephens (born January 1, 1997) is an American basketball player for Crailsheim Merlins of the Basketball Bundesliga (BBL). He played college basketball at Princeton University.

Early life and high school
Stephens grew up in the Lawrenceville section of Lawrence Township, Mercer County, New Jersey and attended The Pennington School before transferring to St. Andrew's School in Middletown, Delaware after his sophomore year. He committed to play college basketball at Princeton over offers from Brown, Columbia, Holy Cross, Penn, Seton Hall and Yale.

College career
Stephens came off the bench as a freshman and averaged 5.5 points in 29 games played. As a sophomore, Stephens  was named first team All-Ivy League and the conference Defensive Player of the Year averaged 12.5 points and 4.6 rebounds per game and blocked 22 shots. He was named second team All-Ivy after averaging 15.3 points and 6.3 rebounds in his junior season. Stephens was named first team All-Ivy as a senior after averaging 13.6 points and 6.4 rebounds per game.

Professional career
Stephens signed with Oldenburger TB of the German ProB on December 7, 2019.

Stephens signed with the Vilpas Vikings of the Finnish Korisliiga for the 2020–2021 season. He averaged 12.7 points and 5.9 rebounds on the season.

Stephens signed with Belgian team Kangoeroes Mechelen of the BNXT League on September 3, 2021.

On July 18, 2022, he has signed with Crailsheim Merlins of the Basketball Bundesliga (BBL).

References

External links
Princeton Tigers bio
RealGM profile

1997 births
Living people
21st-century African-American sportspeople
African-American basketball players
American expatriate basketball people in Belgium
American expatriate basketball people in Finland
American expatriate basketball people in Germany
American men's basketball players
Basketball players from New Jersey
Crailsheim Merlins players
EWE Baskets Juniors players
Kangoeroes Basket Mechelen players
People from Lawrence Township, Mercer County, New Jersey
Princeton Tigers men's basketball players
Shooting guards
Sportspeople from Mercer County, New Jersey
The Pennington School alumni